Dariusz Dudka (born 9 December 1983) is a retired Polish footballer. He played as a defensive midfielder or full-back and also as a centre-back. He is currently an assistant coach of Ekstraklasa club Lech Poznań.

Club career
Born in Kostrzyn nad Odrą, Dudka began his career at hometown club Celuloza Kostrzyn, before moving to Amica Wronki. He made his debut for Amica Wronki in the Ekstraklasa on 4 April 2000. In 2005, he moved to Wisła Kraków, where he made 77 league appearances. In June 2008, he joined Ligue 1 side Auxerre. After four seasons he moved to Levante on a free transfer.

After a trial, Dudka signed a two-month contract with English Championship club Birmingham City on 31 October 2013. He made two appearances, the last on 7 December, was reportedly surprised at the pace of the game in the Championship, and left the club when his contract expired.

International career
Dudka represented Poland at the 2006 FIFA World Cup, Euro 2008 and Euro 2012.

Career statistics

Club

1 Including Polish SuperCup.

International goals

Honours

Club
Amica Wronki
 Polish SuperCup: 2000

Wisła Kraków
 Ekstraklasa: 2007–08

Lech Poznań
 Polish SuperCup: 2015, 2016

References

External links
 
 National team stats at pzpn.pl 

1983 births
Living people
People from Kostrzyn nad Odrą
Polish footballers
Association football midfielders
Poland international footballers
2006 FIFA World Cup players
UEFA Euro 2008 players
UEFA Euro 2012 players
Amica Wronki players
Wisła Kraków players
AJ Auxerre players
Levante UD footballers
Birmingham City F.C. players
Lech Poznań players
Lech Poznań II players
Ekstraklasa players
Ligue 1 players
La Liga players
English Football League players
III liga players
Polish expatriate footballers
Expatriate footballers in France
Expatriate footballers in Spain
Expatriate footballers in England
Sportspeople from Lubusz Voivodeship
Association football defenders